AMD Accelerated Processing Unit (APU), formerly known as Fusion, is a series of 64-bit microprocessors from Advanced Micro Devices (AMD), combining a general-purpose AMD64 central processing unit (CPU) and 3D integrated graphics processing unit (IGPU) on a single die.

AMD announced the first generation APUs, Llano for high-performance and Brazos for low-power devices, in January 2011. The second generation Trinity for high-performance and Brazos-2 for low-power devices were announced in June 2012. The third generation Kaveri for high performance devices were launched in January 2014, while Kabini and Temash for low-power devices were announced in the summer of 2013. Since the launch of the Zen microarchitecture, Ryzen and Athlon APUs have released to the global market as Raven Ridge on the DDR4 platform, after Bristol Ridge a year prior.

AMD has also supplied semi-custom APUs for consoles starting with the release of Sony PlayStation 4 and Microsoft Xbox One eighth generation video game consoles.

History
The AMD Fusion project started in 2006 with the aim of developing a system on a chip that combined a CPU with a GPU on a single die. This effort was moved forward by AMD's acquisition of graphics chipset manufacturer ATI in 2006. The project reportedly required three internal iterations of the Fusion concept to create a product deemed worthy of release. Reasons contributing to the delay of the project include the technical difficulties of combining a CPU and GPU on the same die at a 45 nm process, and conflicting views on what the role of the CPU and GPU should be within the project.

The first generation desktop and laptop APU, codenamed Llano, was announced on 4 January 2011 at the 2011 Consumer Electronics Show in Las Vegas and released shortly thereafter. It featured K10 CPU cores and a Radeon HD 6000 series GPU on the same die on the FM1 socket. An APU for low-power devices was announced as the Brazos platform, based on the Bobcat microarchitecture and a Radeon HD 6000 series GPU on the same die.

At a conference in January 2012, corporate fellow Phil Rogers announced that AMD would re-brand the Fusion platform as the Heterogeneous System Architecture (HSA), stating that "it's only fitting that the name of this evolving architecture and platform be representative of the entire, technical community that is leading the way in this very important area of technology and programming development." However, it was later revealed that AMD had been the subject of a trademark infringement lawsuit by the Swiss company Arctic, who used the name "Fusion" for a line of power supply products.

The second generation desktop and laptop APU, codenamed Trinity was announced at AMD's 2010 Financial Analyst Day and released in October 2012. It featured Piledriver CPU cores and Radeon HD 7000 series GPU cores on the FM2 socket. AMD released a new APU based on the Piledriver microarchitecture on 12 March 2013 for Laptops/Mobile and on 4 June 2013 for desktops under the codename Richland. The second generation APU for low-power devices, Brazos 2.0, used exactly the same APU chip, but ran at higher clock speed and rebranded the GPU as Radeon HD 7000 series and used a new I/O controller chip.

Semi-custom chips were introduced in the Microsoft Xbox One and Sony PlayStation 4 video game consoles, and subsequently in the Microsoft Xbox Series X|S and Sony PlayStation 5 consoles.

A third generation of the technology was released on 14 January 2014, featuring greater integration between CPU and GPU. The desktop and laptop variant is codenamed Kaveri, based on the Steamroller architecture, while the low-power variants, codenamed Kabini and Temash, are based on the Jaguar architecture.

Since the introduction of Zen-based processors, AMD renamed their APUs as the Ryzen with Radeon Graphics and Athlon with Radeon Graphics, with desktop units assigned with G suffix on their model numbers (e.g. Ryzen 5 3400G & Athlon 3000G)  to distinguish them from regular processors or with basic graphics and also to differentiate away from their former Bulldozer era A-series APUs. The mobile counterparts were always paired with Radeon Graphics regardless of suffixes.

In November 2017, HP released the Envy x360, featuring the Ryzen 5 2500U APU, the first 4th generation APU, based on the Zen CPU architecture and the Vega graphics architecture.

Features

Heterogeneous System Architecture 

AMD is a founding member of the Heterogeneous System Architecture (HSA) Foundation and is consequently actively working on developing HSA in cooperation with other members. The following hardware and software implementations are available in AMD's APU-branded products:

Feature overview

APU or Radeon Graphics branded platforms 

AMD APUs have a unique architecture: they have AMD CPU modules, cache, and a discrete-class graphics processor, all on the same die using the same bus. This architecture allows for the use of graphics accelerators, such as OpenCL, with the integrated graphics processor. The goal is to create a "fully integrated" APU, which, according to AMD, will eventually feature 'heterogeneous cores' capable of processing both CPU and GPU work automatically, depending on the workload requirement.

TeraScale-based GPU

K10 architecture (2011): Llano 

 "Stars" AMD K10-cores
 Integrated Evergreen/VLIW5-based GPU (branded Radeon HD 6000 Series)
 Northbridge
 PCIe
 DDR3 memory controller to arbitrate between coherent and non-coherent memory requests. The physical memory is partitioned between the GPU (up to 512 MB) and the CPU (the remainder).
 Unified Video Decoder
 AMD Eyefinity multi-monitor-support

The first generation APU, released in June 2011, was used in both desktops and laptops. It was based on the K10 architecture and built on a 32 nm process featuring two to four CPU cores on a thermal design power (TDP) of 65-100 W, and integrated graphics based on the Radeon HD6000 Series with support for DirectX 11, OpenGL 4.2 and OpenCL 1.2. In performance comparisons against the similarly priced Intel Core i3-2105, the Llano APU was criticised for its poor CPU performance and praised for its better GPU performance. AMD was later criticised for abandoning Socket FM1 after one generation.

Bobcat architecture (2011): Ontario, Zacate, Desna, Hondo 

 Bobcat-based CPU
 Evergreen/VLIW5-based GPU (branded Radeon HD 6000 Series and Radeon HD 7000 Series)
 Northbridge
 PCIe support.
 DDR3 SDRAM memory controller to arbitrate between coherent and non-coherent memory requests. The physical memory is partitioned between the GPU (up to 512 MB) and the CPU (the remainder).
 Unified Video Decoder (UVD)

The AMD Brazos platform was introduced on 4 January 2011, targeting the subnotebook, netbook and low power small form factor markets. It features the 9-watt AMD C-Series APU (codename: Ontario) for netbooks and low power devices as well as the 18-watt AMD E-Series APU (codename: Zacate) for mainstream and value notebooks, all-in-ones and small form factor desktops. Both APUs feature one or two Bobcat x86 cores and a Radeon Evergreen Series GPU with full DirectX11, DirectCompute and OpenCL support including UVD3 video acceleration for HD video including 1080p.

AMD expanded the Brazos platform on 5 June 2011 with the announcement of the 5.9-watt AMD Z-Series APU (codename: Desna) designed for the Tablet market. The Desna APU is based on the 9-watt Ontario APU. Energy savings were achieved by lowering the CPU, GPU and northbridge voltages, reducing the idle clocks of the CPU and GPU as well as introducing a hardware thermal control mode. A bidirectional turbo core mode was also introduced.

AMD announced the Brazos-T platform on 9 October 2012. It comprised the 4.5-watt AMD Z-Series APU (codenamed Hondo) and the A55T Fusion Controller Hub (FCH), designed for the tablet computer market. The Hondo APU is a redesign of the Desna APU. AMD lowered energy use by optimizing the APU and FCH for tablet computers.

The Deccan platform including Krishna and Wichita APUs were cancelled in 2011. AMD had originally planned to release them in the second half 2012.

Piledriver architecture (2012): Trinity and Richland 

 Piledriver-based CPU
 Northern Islands/VLIW4-based GPU (branded Radeon HD 7000 and 8000 Series)
 Unified Northbridge – includes AMD Turbo Core 3.0, which enables automatic bidirectional power management between CPU modules and GPU. Power to the CPU and GPU is controlled automatically by changing the clock rate depending on the load. For example, for a non-overclocked A10-5800K APU the CPU frequency can change from 1.4 GHz to 4.2 GHz, and the GPU frequency can change from 304 MHz to 800 MHz. In addition, CC6 mode is capable of powering down individual CPU cores, while PC6 mode is able to lower the power on the entire rail.
 AMD HD Media Accelerator – includes AMD Perfect Picture HD, AMD Quick Stream technology, and AMD Steady Video technology.
 Display controllers: AMD Eyefinity-support for multi-monitor set-ups, HDMI, DisplayPort 1.2, DVI

Trinity
The first iteration of the second generation platform, released in October 2012, brought improvements to CPU and GPU performance to both desktops and laptops. The platform features 2 to 4 Piledriver CPU cores built on a 32 nm process with a TDP between 65 W and 100 W, and a GPU based on the Radeon HD7000 Series with support for DirectX 11, OpenGL 4.2, and OpenCL 1.2. The Trinity APU was praised for the improvements to CPU performance compared to the Llano APU.

Richland
 "Enhanced Piledriver" CPU cores
 Temperature Smart Turbo Core technology. An advancement of the existing Turbo Core technology, which allows internal software to adjust the CPU and GPU clock speed to maximise performance within the constraints of the Thermal design power of the APU.
 New low-power consumption CPUs with only 45 W TDP

The release of this second iteration of this generation was 12 March 2013 for mobile parts and 5 June 2013 for desktop parts.

Graphics Core Next-based GPU

Jaguar architecture (2013): Kabini and Temash 

 Jaguar-based CPU
 Graphics Core Next 2nd Gen-based GPU
 Socket AM1 and Socket FT3 support
 Target segment desktop and mobile

In January 2013 the Jaguar-based Kabini and Temash APUs were unveiled as the successors of the Bobcat-based Ontario, Zacate and Hondo APUs. The Kabini APU is aimed at the low-power, subnotebook, netbook, ultra-thin and small form factor markets, while the Temash APU is aimed at the tablet, ultra-low power and small form factor markets. The two to four Jaguar cores of the Kabini and Temash APUs feature numerous architectural improvements regarding power requirement and performance, such as support for newer x86-instructions, a higher IPC count, a CC6 power state mode and clock gating. Kabini and Temash are AMD's first, and also the first ever quad-core x86 based SoCs. The integrated Fusion Controller Hubs (FCH) for Kabini and Temash are codenamed "Yangtze" and "Salton", respectively. The Yangtze FCH features support for two USB 3.0 ports, two SATA 6 Gbit/s ports, as well as the xHCI 1.0 and SD/SDIO 3.0 protocols for SD-card support.
Both chips feature DirectX 11.1-compliant GCN-based graphics as well as numerous HSA improvements.
They were fabricated at a 28 nm process in an FT3 ball grid array package by Taiwan Semiconductor Manufacturing Company (TSMC), and were released on 23 May 2013.

The PlayStation 4 and Xbox One were revealed to both be powered by 8-core semi-custom Jaguar-derived APUs.

Steamroller architecture (2014): Kaveri 

 Steamroller-based CPU with 2–4 cores
 Graphics Core Next 2nd Gen-based GPU with 192–512 shader processors
 15–95 W thermal design power
 Fastest mobile processor of this series: AMD FX-7600P (35 W)
 Fastest desktop processor of this series: AMD A10-7850K (95 W)
 Socket FM2+ and Socket FP3
 Target segment desktop and mobile
 Heterogeneous System Architecture-enabled zero-copying through pointer passing

The third generation of the platform, codenamed Kaveri, was partly released on 14 January 2014. Kaveri contains up to four Steamroller CPU cores clocked to 3.9 GHz with a turbo mode of 4.1 GHz, up to a 512-core Graphics Core Next GPU, two decode units per module instead of one (which allows each core to decode four instructions per cycle instead of two), AMD TrueAudio, Mantle API, an on-chip ARM Cortex-A5 MPCore, and will release with a new socket, FM2+. Ian Cutress and Rahul Garg of Anandtech asserted that Kaveri represented the unified system-on-a-chip realization of AMD's acquisition of ATI. The performance of the 45 W A8-7600 Kaveri APU was found to be similar to that of the 100 W Richland part, leading to the claim that AMD made significant improvements in on-die graphics performance per watt; however, CPU performance was found to lag behind similarly specified Intel processors, a lag that was unlikely to be resolved in the Bulldozer family APUs. The A8-7600 component was delayed from a Q1 launch to an H1 launch because the Steamroller architecture components allegedly did not scale well at higher clock speeds.

AMD announced the release of the Kaveri APU for the mobile market on 4 June 2014 at Computex 2014, shortly after the accidental announcement on the AMD website on 26 May 2014. The announcement included components targeted at the standard voltage, low-voltage, and ultra-low voltage segments of the market. In early-access performance testing of a Kaveri prototype laptop, AnandTech found that the 35 W FX-7600P was competitive with the similarly priced 17 W Intel i7-4500U in synthetic CPU-focused benchmarks, and was significantly better than previous integrated GPU systems on GPU-focused benchmarks. Tom's Hardware reported the performance of the Kaveri FX-7600P against the 35 W Intel i7-4702MQ, finding that the i7-4702MQ was significantly better than the FX-7600P in synthetic CPU-focused benchmarks, whereas the FX-7600P was significantly better than the i7-4702MQ's Intel HD 4600 iGPU in the four games that could be tested in the time available to the team.

Puma architecture (2014): Beema and Mullins 

 Puma-based CPU
 Graphics Core Next 2nd Gen-based GPU with 128 shader processors
 Socket FT3
 Target segment ultra-mobile

Puma+ architecture (2015): Carrizo-L 

 Puma+-based CPU with 2–4 cores
 Graphics Core Next 2nd Gen-based GPU with 128 shader processors
 12–25 W configurable TDP
 Socket FP4 support; pin-compatible with Carrizo
 Target segment mobile and ultra-mobile

Excavator architecture (2015): Carrizo 

 Excavator-based CPU with 4 cores
 Graphics Core Next 3rd Gen-based GPU
 Memory controller supports DDR3 SDRAM at 2133 MHz and DDR4 SDRAM at 1866 MHz
 15–35 W configurable TDP (with the 15 W cTDP unit having reduced performance)
 Integrated southbridge
 Socket FP4
 Target segment mobile
 Announced by AMD on YouTube (19 November 2014)

Steamroller architecture (Q2–Q3 2015): Godavari 

 Update of the desktop Kaveri series with higher clock frequencies or smaller power envelope
 Steamroller-based CPU with 4 cores
 Graphics Core Next 2nd Gen-based GPU
 Memory controller supports DDR3 SDRAM at 2133 MHz
 65/95 W TDP with support for configurable TDP
Socket FM2+
 Target segment desktop
 Listed since Q2 2015

Excavator architecture (2016): Bristol Ridge and Stoney Ridge 

 Excavator-based CPU with 2–4 cores
 1 MB L2 cache per module
 Graphics Core Next 3rd Gen-based GPU
 Memory controller supports DDR4 SDRAM
 15/35/45/65 W TDP with support for configurable TDP
 28 nm
 Socket AM4 for desktop
 Target segment desktop, mobile and ultra-mobile

Zen architecture (2017): Raven Ridge 

 Zen-based CPU cores with simultaneous multithreading (SMT)
 512 KB L2 cache per core
 4 MB L3 cache
 Precision Boost 2
 Graphics Core Next 5th Gen "Vega"-based GPU
 Memory controller supports DDR4 SDRAM
 Video Core Next as successor of UVD+VCE
 14 nm at GlobalFoundries
 Socket FP5 for mobile and AM4 for desktop
 Target segment desktop and mobile
 Listed since Q4 2017

Zen+ architecture (2019): Picasso 

 Zen+-based CPU microarchitecture
 Refresh of Raven Ridge on 12 nm with improved latency and efficiency/clock frequency. Features similar to Raven Ridge
 Launched January 2019

Zen 2 architecture (2020): Renoir 

 Zen 2-based CPU microarchitecture
 Graphics Core Next 5th Gen "Vega"-based GPU
 VCN 2.1
 Memory controller supports DDR4 and LPDDR4X SDRAM up to 4266 MHz
 15 and 45 W TDP for mobile and 35 and 65 W TDP for desktop
 7 nm at TSMC
 Socket FP6 for mobile and socket AM4 for desktop
 Release early 2020

Zen 3 architecture (2021): Cezanne

 Zen 3-based CPU microarchitecture
 Graphics Core Next 5th Gen "Vega"-based GPU
 Memory controller supports DDR4 and LPDDR4X SDRAM up to 4266 MHz
 Up to 45 W TDP for mobile; 35W to 65W TDP for desktop.
 7 nm at TSMC
 Socket AM4 for desktop
 Socket FP6 for mobile
 Released for mobiles early 2021 with desktop counterparts released in April 2021.

RDNA-based GPU

Zen 3+ architecture (2022): Rembrandt 
 Zen 3+ based CPU microarchitecture
 RDNA 2-based GPU
 Memory controller supports DDR5-4800 and LPDDR5-6400
 Up to 45 W TDP for mobile
 Node: TSMC N6
 Socket FP7 for mobile
 Released for mobiles early 2022

See also 
 List of AMD processors with 3D graphics
 Ryzen
 AMD mobile platform
 List of AMD mobile microprocessors
 Radeon
 Intel Graphics Technology
 List of Nvidia graphics processing units

References

External links 

  by Vinod Tipparaju at SC13 in November 2013
 HSA and the software ecosystem
 HSA

AMD x86 microprocessors
System on a chip
Heterogeneous System Architecture
X86 microarchitectures